The 1899 Duquesne Country and Athletic Club football season was the fifth season of competition for the professional American football team representing the Duquesne Country and Athletic Club. The team allowed only one touchdown all season (to Penn State) and outscored opponents by a total of 372 to 15 while compiling a 10–0 record. Roy Jackson was in his second year as the team's captain and coach.

Schedule

References

Duquesne Country and Athletic Club
Duquesne Country and Athletic Club seasons
Duquesne Country and Athletic Club